Oleg Grigorevich Tyurin (29 June 1937 – 3 March 2010) was a Russian rower who had his best achievements in the double sculls, partnering with Boris Dubrovskiy. In this event, they won an Olympic gold in 1964 and four medals at European and world championships in 1962–1965.

Tyurin was born and raised in Saint Petersburg, but was invited to train in Moscow and join Dubrovsky in double sculls. After retiring from competitions he returned to St. Petersburg where he worked as a rowing coach.

References

External links
 

1937 births
2010 deaths
Russian male rowers
Soviet male rowers
Olympic rowers of the Soviet Union
Rowers at the 1964 Summer Olympics
Olympic gold medalists for the Soviet Union
Olympic medalists in rowing
World Rowing Championships medalists for the Soviet Union
Medalists at the 1964 Summer Olympics
European Rowing Championships medalists